Maithili Sharan (born 4 January 1953) is an Indian mathematician who specialises in  mathematical modelling, biofluid mechanics, Air Pollution and atmospheric boundary layer.

He was awarded in 1992 the Shanti Swarup Bhatnagar Prize for Science and Technology, the highest science award in India,  in the mathematical sciences category. 
Maithili Sharan's notable findings relate to development of mathematical models for the transport of gases in pulmonary and systemic circulations including brain and dispersion of air pollutants in low wind conditions, numerical simulation of Bhopal gas leak, and weak wind nocturnal boundary layer.

References

External links
Indian National Science Academy database
Maithili Sharan

1953 births
Living people
20th-century Indian mathematicians
IIT Delhi alumni
Academic staff of IIT Delhi
University of Rajasthan alumni
Scientists from Rajasthan
Recipients of the Shanti Swarup Bhatnagar Award in Mathematical Science